The following is a list of women classical guitarists by nationality – notable women who are well known for their work in the field of classical music.

Argentina
María Luisa Anido (1907–1996), classical guitarist and composer
María Isabel Siewers (born 1950), international performer and soloist, educator

Australia
Milica Davies (born 1981), Yugoslav-born Australian classical guitarist and recording artist, now based in London
Karin Schaupp (born 1972), German-Australian classical guitarist and actress, member of the Saffire quartet, recording artist

Austria
Caroline Auer (born 1978), classical guitarist, was member of the female guitar quintet "Gitarrissima" 
Marga Bäuml (1916–2004), classical guitarist, gave concerts as a soloist and in a duo with her husband Walter Klasinc (violin) 
Johanna Beisteiner (born 1976), international soloist
Maria Benischek (born 1976), classical guitarist, was member of the female guitar quintet "Gitarrissima" 
Luise Walker (1910–1998), prominent classical guitarist and composer

Belgium
Ilse Alfonso (1929–2017), classical guitarist and educator

Canada
Liona Boyd (born 1949), British-born Canadian classical guitarist, recording artist and writer
Emily Alice Shaw (fl. 2000s), classical guitarist and educator
Laura Young (born 1962), international soloist, chamber musician, recording artist and educator

China
Chen Shanshan (born 1983), guitarist, sometimes performing with other female guitarists as one of the Four Angels
Li Jie (born 1981), classical guitarist performing with God's Favored Girls Super Trio and with the Four Angels quartet
Su Meng (born 1988), classical guitarist performing as a soloist and as one of the Four Angels female guitar quartet
Wang Yameng (born 1981), classical guitarist, performing with the Four Angels female guitar quartet
Xuefei Yang (born 1977), awarding-winning classical guitarist, international performer, recording artist

Cuba
Clara (Cuqui) Nicola (1926–2017), prominent Cuban guitarist and educator

France
Colette Mourey (born 1954), classical guitarist, music educator, musicologist and composer
Ida Presti (1924–1967), child prodigy, prominent classical guitarist and composer, duos with her husband Alexandre Lagoya
Gaëlle Solal (born 1978), international performer, chamber musician and educator

Germany
Margarete Buch (1914–2013), classical guitarist, arranger and music educator, member of the "Buch-Terzett" in Leipzig 
Else Goguel (1924–2017), classical guitarist and music educator, member of the "Buch-Terzett" in Leipzig and the "Gitarrenensemble Bruno Henze" in Berlin 
Maria Kämmerling (born 1946), specializing in contemporary classical guitar music, educator in Denmark
Heike Matthiesen (born 1964), international soloist and chamber musician, specializing in female composers
Monika Rost (born 1943), classical guitarist, lute player and musicologist

Greece
Antigoni Goni (born 1969), international performer and educator, now based in Brussels

Hungary
Krisztina Groß Dobó (born 1977), classical guitarist, was member of the female guitar quintet "Gitarrissima"

Italy
Rita Brondi (1889–1941), classical guitarist, lutenist, singer, composer, and music historian
Francesca Caccini (18 September 1587 – after 1641) was an Italian composer, singer, lutenist, Guitarist, poet, and music teacher of the early Baroque era.
Filomena Moretti (born 1973), guitarist, recording artist and broadcaster, performances throughout Europe
Teresa de Rogatis(1893 – 1979), Italian composer, guitarist, pianist and music teacher

Japan
Keiko Fujiie (born 1963), guitarist and composer
Kaori Muraji (born 1978), classical guitarist and recording artist

Netherlands
Annette Kruisbrink (born 1958), classical guitarist and composer

Paraguay
Berta Rojas (born 1966), international performer, artistic director, broadcaster and recording artist

Russia
Anastasia Bardina (born 1962), virtuoso guitarist, also of seven- and twelve-string guitars
Irina Kulikova (born 1982), international soloist, now based in the Netherlands

South Korea
Kyuhee Park (born 1985), International concert classical guitarist

Spain
Laura Almerich (1940–2019), Catalan guitarist associated with the Nova Cançó movement
Margarita Escarpa (born 1964), classical guitarist specializing in Bach and chamber music recitals, educator
Renata Tarragó (1927–2005), Catalan classical guitarist, international performer and educator

United Kingdom
Nicola Hall (born 1969), award-winning guitarist who has recorded her own guitar transcriptions of classical works

United States
Lily Afshar (born 1950), Iranian-born American classical guitarist, recording artist and educator 
Muriel Anderson (born 1960), classical, fingerstyle and harp guitarist, composer and recording artist
Anisa Angarola (born 1953), international performer, founder of the Los Angeles Guitar Quartet 
Alice Artzt (born 1943), international concert guitarist
AnnaMaria Cardinalli (born 1979), classical guitarist, operatic contralto, investigative researcher and educator
Charo (fl. 1963), Spanish-American guitarist, actress and broadcaster
Sharon Isbin (born 1956), prominent soloist with some 200 orchestras, recording artist and educator
Martha Masters (born 1972), classical guitarist, recording artist and educator
Vahdah Olcott-Bickford (1885–1980), founder of the American Guitar Society in Los Angeles, educator
Ana Vidović (born 1980), Croatian-American classical guitarist, child prodigy, recording artist

Uruguay
Adriana Balboa (born 1966), classical guitarist, recording artist and educator, has lived since 1993 in Berlin

See also
Lists of women in music
Women in classical music

Classical
Classical guitarists
 
Lists of women in music